Twilight in Delhi is Ahmed Ali's first novel, originally published in English by the Hogarth Press in Britain in 1940.  The novel addresses India's changing social, political, and cultural climate following colonialism.

Plot summary
The novel is set around 1911 to 1919 in Delhi. Ahmed Ali has vividly drawn the picture of old Delhi and its Muslim inhabitants of that era. He depicts the themes of disintegration, degeneration, alienation, gender and social conflicts, nostalgia, the downfall of the Mughal emperors, and the effects of  colonialism and imperialism on Indian Muslims in Delhi.

The novel is shot through with rich symbolic imagery. The palm tree, the henna plant, dogs, cats and pigeons refer not only to the behaviors of characters but also the whole Muslim society. The novel starts at dawn, with "twilight" referring to the rise of the sun as well as the rise of the protagonist Mir Nihal's living standards. By contrast, descriptions of twilight at evening in the closing sentences portray the overall downfall and destruction of not only the family of Mir Nihal but also the Mughal Empire altogether.

The novel was not published until after the intervention of the prominent English writer E. M. Forster.

References

External links
 Free downloadable pdf version of the novel
Twilight in Delhi Summary and Analysis

Novels set in Delhi
1940 novels
Indian novels
Novels about colonialism
Books about Delhi
20th-century Indian novels